The Breeders' Stakes is a stakes race for Thoroughbred race horses foaled in Canada, first run in 1889. Since 1959, it has been the third race in the Canadian Triple Crown for three-year-olds. Held annually in August at Woodbine Racetrack in Toronto, Ontario, the Breeders' Stakes follows the June running of the King's Plate and the July running of the Prince of Wales Stakes. At a distance of one-and-a-half miles, the Breeders' Stakes is the longest of the three Triple Crown races and is the only jewel raced on turf (the King's Plate is raced on Tapeta synthetic dirt and the Prince of Wales on a traditional dirt track).

History
In 1959, the Canadian Triple Crown was created and then won by New Providence. Six more three-year-olds, including the filly Dance Smartly, have since equalled the feat, with four of them doing so in a five-year period from 1989 to 1993.

Six horses have won the first two legs of the Triple Crown but lost on the grass in the Breeders' Stakes. They are:
1970: Almoner finished second to Mary of Scotland (1970)
1975: L'Enjoleur finished third to Momigi (1975)
1976: Norcliffe finished fifth to Tiny Tinker (1976)
1986: Golden Choice finished third to Carotene (1986)
2000: Scatter The Gold finished third to Lodge Hill (2000)
2020: Mighty Heart finished seventh to Belichick (2020)

In 1973 Saskatoon native, Joan Phipps made history aboard Singing Spirit. Though she finished 11th, she became the first female jockey to compete in one of the Canadian Triple Crown races. In 1999, 26 years after Phipps landmark race, Laurie Gulas rode Free Vacation to victory in the Breeders' Stakes, becoming the first female jockey to win a  Canadian Triple Crown race.

In 2004, Catherine Day Phillips became the first woman trainer to win the Breeders' Stakes.

The 1994 renewal was held at Fort Erie Race Track while the Woodbine turf course was undergoing renovations.

Since 1957, the race has been run at  miles. Earlier renewals were held at:
 9 furlongs — 1889-1924, 1952-1956
 8.5 furlongs — 1925-1951

The greatest longshot to win the race was Miami Deco in 2010, who paid $132.10 for a $2 win bet. The slowest time ever recorded was 2:50 by Crowning Honors in 1985 when the rain turned the course into a "swamp".

Records
Speed  record: 
 2:26 2/5 – Charlie's Dewan (1995)

Most wins by a jockey:
 5 – Patrick Husbands (2003, 2006, 2007, 2015, 2021)

Most wins by a trainer:
 9 – Roger Attfield (2015, 2009, 2001, 1999, 1998, 1993, 1990, 1989, 1986)

Most wins by an owner:
 9 - Joseph E. Seagram (1889, 1891, 1895, 1901, 1905, 1906, 1907, 1908, 1909, 1916)

Winners

A † designates a Triple Crown winner.

References

 Racing Post:

Turf races in Canada
Restricted stakes races in Canada
Flat horse races for three-year-olds
Triple Crown of Thoroughbred Racing
Woodbine Racetrack
Recurring events established in 1889
1889 establishments in Ontario